Zenith Energy Ltd. is an international energy company headquartered in Vancouver, Canada. The company is listed on the London Stock Exchange (LSE: ZEN) and the Oslo Stock Exchange (OSE: ZENA). The company is active in Tunisia, Italy and the Republic of the Congo.

History 
Zenith Energy was incorporated in Vancouver, Canada in the year 2007 by Andrea Cattaneo.

Current Operations 
The company is active in Tunisia, Italy and the Republic of the Congo. It owns and operates a 1,200 hp drilling rig and a workover rig.

Tunisia

In 2021, Zenith Energy acquired a working interest in the producing Ezzauoia, El Bibane and Robbana concessions. Its current onshore portfolio in Tunisia produces a net of approximately 650 bopd, and the company says it is aiming to reach 1000 bopd in the near future. As of June 8, 2022, the company has restarted the operation of onshore well ROB-1. Production at this well had been suspended due to water influx as a result of poor construction in 1988.

Republic of the Congo

Zenith Energy purchased 100% of Anglo African Oil & Gas Congo S.A.U. ("AAOG Congo") on May 5, 2020. Until the expiry of their license on July 18, 2020, the company operated the "Tilapia I" field. In 2021, the company received $128,000 from a subsidiary of Societe Nationale des Petroles du Congo (SNPC) for past oil production from the Tilapia I license. On December 23, 2020, the Ministry of Hydrocarbons of the Republic of the Congo confirmed that they were the winning bidder for "Tilapia II", a new 25 year license for the same field.

Italy

The company holds six onshore natural gas production concessions in Italy, from which it sold 12,713 mcf in 2021.

Benin

The company recently presented an offer for a 9-year license for the operation of Block-1 the Sèmè oilfield, the largest field in the country.

References

Energy companies of Canada
Companies based in Vancouver
Companies listed on the London Stock Exchange
Companies listed on the Oslo Stock Exchange
Canadian companies established in 2007